John Wayne Hastings (born 4 November 1985) is a former Australian international cricketer who played for the Victoria cricket team. He played as an all-rounder.

In October 2017, he announced his retirement from Test and One Day International cricket. Later that month, he retired from all forms of cricket following a lung condition.

Domestic career
At the end of the 2006–07 season, Hastings was recruited from New South Wales, where he had represented the state in under-age and Second XI teams. He impressed with his first one-day games for Victoria and grabbed three wickets in six deliveries on debut in 2007–08, when he was asked to bowl at the death against Queensland. His first-class debut, against the touring Indian national team, was ruined by rain. The following January, he required surgery to have a pin inserted in a fractured finger.   Hastings was given three more first-class opportunities in 2008–09, taking 16 wickets at 18.56, including 5 for 61 against his home state.

On 9 January 2011, he was bought by the Kochi Tuskers Kerala for US$20,000, and in 2014 the Chennai Super Kings purchased him.

He currently plays for the Melbourne Stars, a Twenty20 team.  He is contracted to play for English county side Durham for the 2016 English season. He won the Big Bash Smash for the longest six of the competition

In the players auction for the 2014 IPL, he was bought by Chennai Super Kings for Rs. 50 lakhs (Rs. 5 million).

In 2014,he along with Calum McLeod holds the highest 6th wicket partnership in T20 history(126*)

International career
After a series of injuries to several senior Australian pacemen, Hastings was called into the ODI team to tour India in October 2010. He made his ODI debut against India in Visakhapatnam in October 2010. He did not bat and took 2/44 from ten overs. He removed centurion Virat Kohli and then bowled captain MS Dhoni for a duck later in the same over.

On 18 January 2011, he was announced in Australia's 15-man squad for the 2011 Cricket World Cup.

On 30 November 2012, Hastings made his début as Australia's 430th Test Cricketer against South Africa at the WACA.

In 2015, after a series of injuries to several senior Australian pacemen again, Hastings was called into the ODI team, this time as India tours in Australia in January 2016.

In 2018, however, he has a career-threatening health issue, where he coughs out blood only while bowling. As such, he did not play cricket in 2018.

Honours
Bradman Young Cricketer of the Year: 2010

References

External links
 

1985 births
Australian cricketers
Australian expatriate sportspeople in England
Australia Test cricketers
Australia One Day International cricketers
Australia Twenty20 International cricketers
Cricketers at the 2011 Cricket World Cup
Kochi Tuskers Kerala cricketers
Living people
Cricketers from Sydney
Victoria cricketers
Melbourne Stars cricketers
Kandurata Warriors cricketers
Durham cricketers
Worcestershire cricketers